HCN may refer to:

Science and mathematics 
 HCN channel, a cellular ion channel
 Highly composite number, a type of integer
 Hydrogen cyanide

Transportation 
 Halcyonair, a Cape Verdean airline
 Headcorn railway station, in England
 Hengchun Airport, in Taiwan

Other 
 Health Communication Network, an Australian software company
 High Country News, an American newspaper